Out of the Air is an album by the Irish uilleann pipes player Davy Spillane, that was originally released on Tara Music in 1988. AllMusic awards this album with 4 stars.

Following the release of his 'Atlantic Bridge' album, Uilleann Piper Davy put together a touring band including, Anto Drennan on Guitar, James Delaney on keyboards, Tony Molloy on bass, Paul Moran on drums. While on a UK tour the band recorded a session for BBC Radio One. Even though the session was recorded in the BBC studios with no audience it has since its release been regarded as a live recording.  Additional studio sessions which included Rory Gallagher were added before the album's release.

Track listing
 "Atlantic Bridge" (Davy Spillane) – 5:25
 "River of Gems" (Spillane) – 6:40
 "Daire's Dream" (Spillane) – 4:07
 "The Storm" (Dónal Lunny, Spillane) – 5:55
 "Mystic Seacliffs" (Bill Whelan, Spillane) – 3:50
 "The Road to Ballyalla" (Spillane) – 8:38
 "Litton Lane" (Delaney, Drennan, Molloy, Moran, Spillane) – 5:16
 "One for Phil" (Rory Gallagher, Spillane) – 2:28

Personnel
 Davy Spillane - uilleann pipes, low whistle
 Anthony Drennan - guitar
 Rory Gallagher - guitar 
 James Delaney - keyboards
 Tony Molloy - bass
 Paul Moran - drums

References

1988 live albums
Davy Spillane albums